The twenty-fifth season of the American animated television series The Simpsons began airing on Fox on September 29, 2013, and ended on May 18, 2014.

In this season, Homer sells his Mapple stock to buy a bowling ball; Marge blames herself and Kiss for Bart's rebellious streak ("Four Regrettings and a Funeral"); Lisa becomes a cheerleader for Springfield's football team; and Homer delivers a baby ("Labor Pains"). Guest stars for this season include Judd Apatow, Will Arnett, Anderson Cooper, Harlan Ellison, Zach Galifianakis, Stan Lee, Eva Longoria, Rachel Maddow, Elisabeth Moss, Joe Namath, Daniel Radcliffe, Aaron Sorkin, Max von Sydow, Kristen Wiig, and Kelsey Grammer. This is Al Jean's 13th consecutive season as showrunner and 15th overall. Matt Groening, James L. Brooks, Matt Selman, and John Frink serve as executive producers. Executive producer Al Jean stated that Edna Krabappel was retired from the show following the death of Marcia Wallace on October 25, 2013.

No episodes aired in February due to Fox airing the Super Bowl XLVIII, the 2014 Winter Olympics, the 2014 Daytona 500 and the 86th Academy Awards.

This season of The Simpsons won three Primetime Emmy Awards out of four nominations, including a Primetime Emmy Award for Character Voice-Over Performance to Harry Shearer, who was the last member of the main cast to earn the award.

Episodes

References

Bibliography

Simpsons season 25
2013 American television seasons
2014 American television seasons